The  Tampa Bay Storm season is the 22nd season for the American Arena Football League franchise, their 18th season in Tampa, Florida. The Storm were able to finish the season with an 8–8 record, but missed the playoffs due to losing a tiebreaker with the New Orleans VooDoo and New York Dragons, both teams finishing with the same record as the Storm. This was only the second time ever that the franchise had failed to make the playoffs, the first time being in 2006.

Standings

Regular season schedule

Coaching

Roster

Stats

Regular season

Week 1: at Kansas City Brigade

Week 2: vs. Georgia Force

Week 3: at New Orleans VooDoo

Week 4
Bye Week

Week 5: at Philadelphia Soul

Week 6: at Columbus Destroyers

Week 7: vs. Arizona Rattlers

Week 8: vs. New York Dragons

Week 9: at Orlando Predators

Week 10: vs. Chicago Rush

Week 11: vs. New Orleans VooDoo

Week 12: at Grand Rapids Rampage

Week 13: vs. Cleveland Gladiators

Week 14: at Georgia Force

Week 15: vs. Orlando Predators

Week 16: at San Jose SaberCats

Week 17: vs. Los Angeles Avengers

External links

Tampa Bay Storm
Tampa Bay Storm seasons
Tampa